Carrick is a south neighborhood of Pittsburgh, Pennsylvania in the United States.  It is served by two zip codes, 15210 and 15227, and has representation on Pittsburgh City Council by the council member for District 4 (South Neighborhoods) with a part in District 3.

Located between the suburbs of the South Hills and downtown, Carrick is well-served by public transportation. Once home to prominent mansions and wealthy families, the neighborhood currently has an affordable, solid housing stock and remains family-oriented. The neighborhood has, since the early 2000's, become the epicenter of Pittsburgh's burgeoning Nepali and Bhutanese communities.

Geography
Carrick is located on the southeastern edge of the City of Pittsburgh. It is situated atop a crest west of the Monongahela River. Brownsville Road runs across the top of the crest and is the main thoroughfare through the neighborhood.

Surrounding neighborhoods
Carrick has nine borders, including the Pittsburgh neighborhoods of Knoxville and Mt. Oliver to the north, St. Clair to the northeast, Overbrook to the southwest, Brookline to the west, and Bon Air to the northwest. The remaining borders are with the borough of Mt. Oliver to the north (between Knoxville and its Pittsburgh neighborhood namesake), Baldwin to the east, and Brentwood to the south and southeast.

History
Carrick was originally part of the land grant to Major John Ormsby from King George III in 1763 for his service during the French and Indian War.  Carrick and Mt. Oliver were once known as the Ormsby Tract or simply Ormsby.  The city of Birmingham was organized on this land by Ormsby's son in law Nathanial Bedford.
It became known for coal mines and a glassworks in the Crailo area, also known as Spiketown, near the Presbyterian Church and Volunteers Field.

In 1853, Dr. John H. O'Brien received permission from the United States Postal Service to establish a post office in the area; for his hard work he was given the honor of naming it, and he chose "Carrick" after his home town, Carrick-on-Suir, Ireland. Carrick became a Borough in 1904 and in 1926 voted to become part of the City of Pittsburgh. In 1927 it officially became known as the 29th Ward.

Public facilities

The neighborhood boasts of numerous parklet playgrounds, the Carnegie Library of Carrick, historic Phillips Park (comprising walking paths, a disc golf course, a recreation center and swimming pool) and Volunteers Field (comprising a baseball-only field and a multipurpose athletic field).  Carrick is also the home to Emma Lazarus Sensory Garden, where the Columbia of Carrick mural by Brian Gonnella is located.

In 1997, Carrick was named the first "Cool Community" in the northern United States by the U.S. Department of Energy. "Cool Community" is a national recognition program for strategic treeplanting for energy conservation purposes. Partnering with conservation organizations, community groups worked to weatherize homes and businesses, plant trees and flowers, and add elements of "green building" to the renovation of Carrick High School.

The Pittsburgh Bureau of Fire houses Engine 23 in Carrick. Engine 23 is a 2000 gal (7570 L) Spartan Metro-Star engine. It also houses Command Unit 200, which is a combination 2007 Pierce / LDV command unit.

Education
Carrick High School
Concord Elementary School
Roosevelt Elementary School

Places of worship
Carrick includes Roman Catholic, Protestant, Evangelical, Jehovah's Witness, Lutheran, and Byzantine Catholic places of worship.

See also
List of Pittsburgh neighborhoods
Carrick Borough Building
Wigman House

References

Further reading

External links
Carrick-Overbrook Historical Society
Interactive Pittsburgh Neighborhoods Map
Pittsburgh City Council District 3 Summary

Former municipalities in Pennsylvania
Neighborhoods in Pittsburgh
History of Pittsburgh
1904 establishments in Pennsylvania